Four Home Unions v Rest of Europe was a rugby union match played in 1990 to raise money for the rebuilding of Romania following the overthrow of Nicolae Ceaușescu in December 1989.  The Four Home Unions team's logo was that used by the British & Irish Lions. The Rest of Europe played under the badge of the Romanian Rugby Federation. The match was played at Twickenham, and the Four Home Unions won the match 43–18 with England captain Will Carling scoring two tries. The winners were awarded The Skilball Trophy.

Teams

Four Home Unions
A G Hastings 
A G Stanger 
W D C Carling 
J C Guscott 
R Underwood 
C R Andrew 
R J Hill 
D M B Sole 
B C Moore 
M Griffiths 
P J Ackford 
N P Francis 
J Jeffrey 
P J Winterbottom 
N P Mannion 
Replacements
C H Chalmers 
S M Bates 
J A Probyn 
K S Milne 
D J Turnbull 
D F Cronin in teamsheet

Rest of Europe
M Toader 
M Dancla  (uncapped)
G Danglade  (uncapped)
N Fulina 
P Lagisquet 
P Capitani  (uncapped)
A Hueber (uncapped although later capped for France)
M Pujolle 
P Dintrans 
G Rossi 
M Cécillon 
S Ciorascu 
T Janeczek 
H Dumitras 
A Tichonov 

Replacements
L Armary 
P T Capdevielle 
K Tapper 
F Torossian 
F Gaetaniello 
I Mironov 
J Moreno

Notes

British & Irish Lions matches
1989–90 in European rugby union
1989–90 in British rugby union
1989–90 in French rugby union
1989–90 in English rugby union
1989–90 in Welsh rugby union
1989–90 in Irish rugby union